The  2010 Honda Indy 200 presented by Westfield Insurance was the fourth running of the Honda 200 and the twelfth round of the 2010 IndyCar Series season. It took place on Sunday, August 8, 2010. The race contested over 85 laps at the  Mid-Ohio Sports Car Course in Lexington, Ohio.

Classification

Qualifying

Race

References

Indy 200 at Mid-Ohio
Honda Indy 200
Honda Indy 200
Honda Indy 200